Dr. Jekyll and Ms. Hyde is a 1995 science fiction comedy film directed by David Price, based on Robert Louis Stevenson's 1886 horror novella Strange Case of Dr Jekyll and Mr Hyde. It stars Sean Young, Tim Daly, and Lysette Anthony. The story takes place in modern times and concerns a bumbling chemist who tampers with his great-grandfather's formula, accidentally transforming himself into a beautiful businesswoman who is determined to take over his life.

Plot
Dr. Richard Jacks is a perfumer working at a major fragrance company. His projects have failed and the chief executive, Mrs. Unterveldt rejects his latest perfume, claiming that it is a woman's perfume, and she wants a woman working on it. After his great-uncle dies, Richard attends the will reading. He receives nothing but old notes from scientific experiments and discovers that he is the great-grandson of Dr. Henry Jekyll. He then decides to add more estrogen to his ancestor's original formula, hoping to perfect it. He ingests the serum, but after waiting all night nothing happens. His alarm reminds to attend a job interview at a restaurant. Shortly after being seated, the transformation starts. His arm hair disappears, his voice starts to change, and his penis and testicles transform into a vagina inside his pants. His hair grows out, and he grows breasts. Shocked, he runs out of the restaurant and back to his work lab.

Adopting the alias of "Helen Hyde", the woman convinces Richard's colleagues that she is his new assistant. She rewrites his reports, is kind to his secretary, flirts with his superiors, Yves Dubois and Oliver Mintz, and rewards herself with a shopping spree. Later, Helen meets and befriends Richard's fiancée, Sarah, and convinces her to move out of his apartment.

The next day, after several comments from colleagues, Richard realizes that he doesn't remember turning into Helen. Nonetheless, he feels invigorated and invites Sarah to his place for a romantic meal. Everything appears to be going well until he realizes he is transforming into Helen again, causing Sarah to flee in confusion. Helen becomes resentful at having to share a body. She stages a workplace accident for Richard's friend Pete so she can steal his job as a perfumer. She even attempts to seduce Oliver, but suddenly turns back into Richard, who is forced to flee in terror. Oliver names Helen as Richard's supervisor. When Richard tries handcuffing himself in underwear in order to shoot the transformation and keep Helen from leaving his apartment, he is surprised by Sarah, who believes they are having an affair after finding Helen's clothes in his closet.

Helen then has a private meeting with Dubois and Mintz presenting "Indulge", a perfume she stole from Richard. She simultaneously fondles both men's crotches with her hosed feet to get their approval for Indulge. Helen then makes two videotapes, revealing to Richard that she intends to take over his body completely. Richard tries to get her fired by stripping naked in his office and writing obscene comments on his nude body, but miscalculates the transformation time which causes him not to transform, and Richard winds up getting fired. Helen also intercepts a call from Pete, who intends to prove that she stole his work; pretending to be a stranded driver and electrocutes him.

Sarah is finally convinced when Richard shows her security footage of his first transformation. He manages to concoct a new formula to get rid of Helen for good, but Sarah must administer it once he transforms. To avoid letting her escape, Richard handcuffs his hands and straps his feet to a bed. Sarah only manages to administer part of the formula before Helen escapes to attend Indulge's launch party.

Sarah follows Helen into the party and realizes that the formula is gradually changing her back into Richard. Once Helen goes up to celebrate the success of her new perfume, Sarah injects her with the remaining formula. Richard is restored to normal and gives a speech to his colleagues, admitting that he was really Helen but claiming that he needed to become a woman to understand them. His boss then hires him back, with a promotion and some vacation time so he can recover. Richard then walks out of the party with Sarah.

Cast

Reception
The film received a 14% "rotten" rating on Rotten Tomatoes.

The film was nominated for three Razzie Awards including Worst Actress for Sean Young, Worst Remake or Sequel and Worst Screen Couple for Daly and Young. It was also nominated for Most Painfully Unfunny Comedy at the 1995 Stinkers Bad Movie Awards.

"At an age when she should be hitting her stride", wrote film critic Mick LaSalle, "she is already parodying herself – parodying her public image, of all things, not her screen image...It's just possible that schlock is Young's natural element and roles like this her true calling". Hugo Davenport in The Daily Telegraph said, "Apart from being a travesty of Stevenson, it is so crass, witless and misogynistic that it makes Confessions of a Window Cleaner look like Dostoevsky".

A review from The Austin Chronicle summarized the film by saying, "Overall, this PG-13 bore is neither crass enough nor intelligent enough to hold anyone's attention."

Home media
After its theatrical run, HBO Video released the film onto VHS and Laserdisc. It was released on DVD in 2004.

See also
 List of American films of 1995
 Dr. Jekyll and Sister Hyde, another, earlier, version of the story also featuring a female Hyde.

Notes

External links
 
 
 
 
 
 

Dr. Jekyll and Mr. Hyde films
1995 films
1995 comedy films
1995 science fiction films
1990s American films
1990s British films
1990s Canadian films
1990s English-language films
1990s science fiction comedy films
American science fiction comedy films
British science fiction comedy films
Canadian science fiction comedy films
English-language Canadian films
Films directed by David Price
Films shot in Montreal
Savoy Pictures films
Transgender-related films